Vuokkijärvi is a medium-sized lake in the Oulujoki main catchment area. It is located in the region of Kainuu, eastern Finland. The surface level of the lake is strongly regulated due to power production. Elevation can vary between 183.72 and 189.72 meters.

See also
List of lakes in Finland

References

Lakes of Suomussalmi